Northwood is a village and civil parish on the Isle of Wight. It lies south of the town of Cowes and has been occupied for about 1000 years. The Church of St. John the Baptist in Northwood, was first built between the 11th and 13th centuries.

There is a primary school in Northwood which was first begun in 1855. Until 1990 it still featured an outside toilet.

The main form of transport is Southern Vectis bus route 1, which runs every 7–8 minutes in the daytime to Cowes and Newport, along the main road. Local bus service route 32 is provided by the setting up of a Joint Scheme involving Southern Vectis and the Parish Council mid-2011. Several changes to this route have occurred after Southern Vectis withdrew their 27 to Cowes and 28 to Newport.

References

External links

Northwood Village website
Northwood Primary School official website

Villages on the Isle of Wight
Civil parishes in the Isle of Wight